The 2010 Missouri State Auditor election took place on November 2, 2010.  Republican Ambassador Tom Schweich defeated incumbent Democratic State Auditor Susan Montee. It was only the third time in the last four decades that a sitting auditor in Missouri was unseated.  Schweich's victory made him one of only two Republicans elected to Missouri's executive branch.

Democratic primary

Campaign
Incumbent Missouri State Auditor Susan Montee had token opposition. She easily defeated her lesser known opponent in the Democratic primary.

Results

Republican primary

Campaign
Missouri State Representative Allen Icet announced his candidacy in June, 2009.  Ambassador Tom Schweich joined the race in July, 2009, after having considered running for US Senator.  The primary was a close race.  Icet had experience as the chairman of the state house budget committee and he was supported by 95 state legislators.  Schweich had experience managing audits and was supported by Lieutenant Governor of Missouri Peter Kinder, former United States Attorney General John Ashcroft, former Governor of Massachusetts Mitt Romney, four Missouri state senators, and two former United States ambassadors.

Schweich criticized Icet for taking trips and meals from lobbyists and for the fact that the state budget rose from $19 billion to $23 billion while Icet was chairman of the house budget committee.  Icet defended himself by saying that the trip he accepted was for educational purposes and by saying that most of the budget increases were due to increased federal spending and mandatory increases of things such as Medicare.

In spite of Icet's support from most of the state legislators, Schweich was able to gain a fundraising advantage and bigger name endorsements.

Results

Libertarian Primary

Results

General election

Campaign
During the campaign Montee attacked Schweich for not being a Certified Public Accountant.  Schweich defended himself by pointing to his experience managing audits. During the debate Schweich argued that the state auditor ought to be more of a law enforcement official; he pointed to the fact that he has law enforcement experience, while Montee did not. Montee argued that the state auditor should be a fiscal expert; she again pointed to the fact that she was a CPA, while Schweich was not.

In the end, Schweich defeated Montee with 50.8% of the vote. Schweich obtained strong leads in the rural parts of the state which was sufficient to overcome Montee's leads in urban St. Louis and Jackson County.

Results

See also
2010 Missouri elections
2010 United States Senate election in Missouri
2010 Missouri Senate election

References

External links
Elections from the Missouri Secretary of State

auditor
Missouri State Auditor elections
November 2010 events in the United States
Missouri